Minicia is a genus of dwarf spiders that was first described by Tamerlan Thorell in 1875.

Species
 it contains twelve species and one subspecies:
Minicia alticola Tanasevitch, 1990 – Georgia
Minicia candida Denis, 1946 – Europe
Minicia c. obscurior Denis, 1964 – France
Minicia caspiana Tanasevitch, 1990 – Azerbaijan
Minicia elegans Simon, 1894 – Portugal, Algeria
Minicia floresensis Wunderlich, 1992 – Azores
Minicia gomerae (Schmidt, 1975) – Canary Is.
Minicia grancanariensis Wunderlich, 1987 – Canary Is.
Minicia kirghizica Tanasevitch, 1985 – Central Asia
Minicia marginella (Wider, 1834) (type) – Europe, Caucasus
Minicia pallida Eskov, 1995 – Russia, Kazakhstan
Minicia teneriffensis Wunderlich, 1980 – Canary Is.
Minicia vittata Caporiacco, 1935 – Kashmir

See also
 List of Linyphiidae species (I–P)

References

Araneomorphae genera
Linyphiidae
Spiders of Asia
Taxa named by Tamerlan Thorell